The American City was an American municipal affairs and urban planning magazine published by Buttenheim Publication Corporation from 1909 through 1942. It was based in New York City. The publication was primarily concerned with the design, care, and maintenance of civic infrastructure such as roads, parks, public buildings and public safety design. It was intended to be read by municipal officials and civic workers.  There were two separate editions of The American City, a city and a "town and country" edition. These merged in 1920.

It was edited by Arthur Hastings Grant until 1911 and then by Harold S. Buttenheim through 1942. The Buttenheim Brothers, Harold and Edgar, also founded the American City Bureau, which raised funds for local Community Chests, YMCA and YWCAs, and similar agencies.

References

External links
 The American City (v. 2-29) at Hathi Trust

Magazines established in 1909
Magazines published in New York City
Monthly magazines published in the United States
Science and technology magazines published in the United States
Urban planning